Holy Ghost Preparatory School (often shortened to Holy Ghost Prep, Ghost, or HGP) is a Catholic college-preparatory high school for young men in Bensalem, Pennsylvania, United States. Congregation of the Holy Spirit missionaries founded the school in 1897.

History 
Father John Tuohill Murphy founded Holy Ghost Prep in 1897 as Holy Ghost Apostolic College, a preparatory school and junior-college seminary for young men studying to become Congregation of the Holy Spirit members. In the 1950s, the school started to move its college-level program to Duquesne University. It opened its doors to non-seminarians in 1959 for the first time. In 1967, the school discontinued the seminary program. Holy Ghost Preparatory School was formed as a non-profit institution a year later. In the 1990s, the school began a long-range planning process, which resulted in significant structural enhancements to the campus. Today, its enrollment consists entirely of non-resident, college-bound students.

In 2015, Gregory J. Geruson became the school's first lay president. The school's "Vision 2020" Strategic Plan has resulted in the building a new STEM Tower. Step One of the STEM Tower, the Brennan Innovation Center, opened in August 2017. The rest of the STEM Tower was completed in time for the 2018–19 school year. In early 2018, the school also opened the Holt Center, including a performing arts center, a multi-purpose gymnasium, music instruction rooms, and training areas for baseball, track and field, golf, lacrosse, and rowing. The Holt Center serves Holy Ghost students and will be available to community groups.

Admissions 
Holy Ghost Prep consists of 444 students. Located near the I-95 corridor in metropolitan Philadelphia, the school attracts students from more than 100 feeder schools from Bucks County, other metropolitan Philadelphia counties, and New Jersey.

Demographics

Curriculum 
Graduation requires coursework in English, mathematics, social studies, science, foreign language, fine arts, and theology with many electives, including computer science, cinematography, and portfolio art. As a school for the college-bound, HGP offers an extensive honors and Advanced Placement program, preparing students to take AP tests for college credit in 23 areas of study prescribed by the College Board. AP Calculus AB teacher Jerry Colapinto was awarded the 2007 Siemens AP Teacher of the Year award for Pennsylvania.

Holy Ghost Prep has been recognized by the National Blue Ribbon Schools Program.

Extracurricular activities

Athletics 
Holy Ghost Prep has many interscholastic and intramural sports teams. Major sports include basketball, baseball, ultimate Frisbee, bowling, soccer, swimming, lacrosse, ice hockey, tennis, cross country, rowing golf, and track and field. Athletic facilities on campus include seven fields for various sports, a fieldhouse holding an auditorium and gymnasium, an all-weather track, as well as a new facility, the Holt Center, containing a performing arts theater, music studios, gym, batting cages, as well as a room for the rowing team. Holy Ghost Prep is a member of the Bicentennial Athletic League. The Firebirds have a tradition of excellence in all sports. There have been seven Pennsylvania state champions in school history: the 1972 and 1974 basketball teams, the 1992 soccer team, and, most recently, the 2011 tennis team. In 2013 and 2014, the soccer team won the PIAA state championship. In 2015, the hockey team won its first state championship. Harold “Jr.” McIlwain ('93) won the 400m in 1992 PIAA state track championships and followed that with the 800m title in 1993. Holy Ghost Preparatory School also added a rowing team in Fall 2015.

In the fall of 2020, Holy Ghost Prep left the Bicentennial Athletic League. It began to compete as an independent program while maintaining its membership with the PIAA and District One.

Notable alumni 
Kevin Collins (1986), actor and voice-over artist who appeared in TV shows, such as Law & Order, Guiding Light, and All My Children, Steven Spielberg's film Munich and starred in Jamil Dehlavi's Infinite Justice.
Ryan Gunderson (2003), professional ice hockey player for Brynäs IF of the Swedish Hockey League, and former player for the Columbia Inferno of the ECHL and of the Lowell Devils and Houston Aeros of the AHL
Nolan Jones (2016), professional baseball player for Cleveland Guardians of Major League Baseball.
Frank Seravalli (2006), senior hockey reporter for Canadian all-sports network TSN
Paul McCrane (1978), actor who guest-starred on 24 and played Dr. Robert Romano in TV series ER from 1997 to 2003.
Timothy J. Savage (1964), U.S. federal judge
Rand Geiger (2002), producer of Stranger Things

See also 
Holy Ghost Seminary

Notes and references

Catholic secondary schools in Pennsylvania
Educational institutions established in 1897
Boys' schools in the United States
Schools in Bucks County, Pennsylvania
1897 establishments in Pennsylvania
Spiritan schools